Pigeon Corporation, established in 1978, is a manufacturer of household products. In August 1978, the company created of “Pigeon”, the first fabric softener made in Korea. The company has more than 50% of the Korean market for fabric softeners in Korea.

History 
1978. 01. Pigeon Corporation founded
1978. 07. Fabric Softener, “Pigeon”, is released
1980. 12. Pigeon products exported to the Middle East
1981. 03. Dishwashing liquid, “New Clean”, is released
1981. 04. The First manufacturing facility is completed (Bupyeong)
1981. 06. “Pigeon Rox” is released
1982. 04. Technical Tie with Alberto Culver Co., of the U.S.
1985. 01. Completed the computerization of business
1987. 10. Dish-washing product, “Sora”, is released
1988. 05. The Central Research Institute is established
1988. 07. Drainpipe Cleaner, “Power Drill Pung”, is released
1988. 10. Started to produce laundry detergent, “New Sora”
1989. 05. The second manufacturing facility is completed (Jincheon)
1989. 07. Refrigerator Deodorizer, “Bamboo Pansil”, is released
1990. 02. Hair Care Product, “Duena”, is released
1990. 04. Body Cleanser, “Maplus” is released
1991. 05. Apartment Complex for Company employees is completed
1992. 04. Installed Processing Equipment for the Production of Make-up products in the second manufacturing facility
1992. 07. Signed an exclusive contract with Sunstar of Japan to sell oral care products. Started to import and sell “Do Toothbrush and Toothpaste”
1992. 07. Established an On-Location Company, “Pigeon China daily Use Chem. Co”, in Tianjin, China
1994. 01. The third manufacturing facility in Ulsan is completed
1994. 05  Signed an exclusive sales contract with L&F Inc of the US
1994. 05  Selling of the Anti-Bacterial Spay, “Lysol”, started
1996. 06  Oxygen Bleach, “Paracle” is released
1996. 07  Selected as a Company with Excellence in Labor-Management Relationships
1996. 12  The Number of Pigeon products sold reaches 2 billion units
1997. 07  Technical Tie with Hakugen Corp. of Japan
1997. 07  Insect Repellent “Mrs. Lloyd” is released
1998. 08  Baby care product, “Beau Jules” is released
1999. 09  Business tie with Pigeon Japan
2000. 03  The third generation antibacterial cleaner, “Bisol” is released
2002. 02  Toothpaste, “Denticoen Q10”, is released
2005. 01  Auto Fan Air Freshener, “Aroma Wind”, is released
2005. 01  “Pigeon Charcoal Insect Repellent Dehumidifier” is released
2005. 05  Stain remover “Magic 02 Spray” is released
2005. 06  Liquid Laundry Detergent, “Act’z, Act’z Drum”, is released
2005. 10  Baby care product “Beau Jules ATO-free” is released
2006. 11  Fabric Softener, ‘Pigeon’ renewal is released
2006. 11  Dish Wash Detergent Pure ‘Baking Soda’ is released
2007. 03  Charcoal Dehumidifier ‘Slim Type’ is released
2007. 05  ‘Aroma Plus’ is released
2007. 10  ‘Single Life Set’ Top & Front loading type are released
2007. 11  ‘Leisure Set” is released
2008. 04  ‘Transparent Pigeon’ is released
2008. 04  ‘Act’z Deo Fresh’ is released
2008. 04  ‘Pigeon Deo Fresh’ is released
2008. 06  ‘Antibacterial Bisol Spray & Tissue’ are released
2008. 07  Hand Wash “ MUMU’ is released
2008. 07  Multi-purpose Cleaner ‘Bisol PowerX3’ is released
2009. 04  ‘Totalcare, Pigeon’ is released
2009. 05  ‘SprayPigeon CoolDeo’ is released
2010. 04  ‘Highly Concentrated Pigeon’ is released
2010. 07   Launched children's brand ‘Beau Jules’
2012. 06   Launched ‘Ultra Pigeon’ 
2013. 04   Launched ‘Pigeon Fresh (Purple Lavender, Yellow Bouquet)’ 
2013. 11   Launched ‘Pigeon Premium’
2014. 04   Launched ‘Antiseptic Dirt-Free Premium’
2014. 05   Launched ‘Actz Premium’ 
2017. 07   Launched ‘Highly Concentrated Pigeon Rich Perfume Signature’ 
2018. 02   Launched ‘Pigeon for Dryers’
2018. 05   Launched ‘Rich Perfume Spray’ 
2019. 02   Launched ‘Highly Concentrated Pigeon Rich Perfume’1L
2019. 04   Launched ‘Pigeon Air Sheet’for clothes cleaners
2019. 07   Launched premium type 1 kitchen detergent‘Pure Apple Balm/Virgin Mojito’

Main products lines

Fabric softener 
 Transparent Pigeon
 Pigeon
 Spray Pigeon
 Drum Pigeon
 Aroma Plus

Laundry detergent 
 Act'z
 Act'z Drum
 Wool touch

Disinfectant detergent 
 Bisol
 Bisol PowerX3

Personal Care 
 Maplus(Body Wash)
 MUMU(Hand Wash)

Oxygen Bleach 
 Paracle
 Paracle Liguid
 Magic O2

Dish-washing Liguid 
 Pure
 New Clean

Rox 
 Pigeon RoxPigeon Fragrant Rox
 Pigeon Fragrant Rox, Pigeon Rox detergent
 Power Drill Pung

Dehumidifier 
 Charcoal Dehumidifier

Deodorizer 
 Fine

Toothpaste 
 Denticoen Q10

Baby Products 
 Pigeon Baby Softener
 Pigeon Baby detergent

etc 
 Humaid(Insect Killer)
 Dario & Hard-type Dario(Ironing Aid)

External links

Pigeon Official website
Pigeon Official On-Line shop
Pigeon Brand website
Act'z Brand website
Bisol Brand website

Companies based in Seoul
Manufacturing companies established in 1978
South Korean companies established in 1978
Conglomerate companies of South Korea
Personal care companies
Personal care brands
Dental companies
South Korean brands